Love Life (known as Liebesleben in German) is a 2007 German/Israeli film directed by Maria Schrader and shot in Israel. It is based on a novel by Zeruya Shalev, with the screenplay written by Schrader and Laila Stieler. The film won two 2008 Bavarian Film Awards for Best Cinematography (Benedict Neuenfels) and  Best Music (Niki Reiser). Neuenfels also won the 2008 German Film Award for Best Cinematography.

Cast
Netta Garti as Ya'ara
Rade Sherbedgia as Arie
Tovah Feldshuh as Hannah
Stephen Singer as Leon
Ishai Golan as Joni
Arie Moskonaas Nathan
Caroline Silhol as Josephine
Assi Dayan as Jara's Professor
Clara Khoury as Shira
Gillian Buick as Vivien
Zach Cohen as Cat Killer
Leonie Kranzle as Kenneth
Zeruya Shalev as Librarian
Esther Zewko as Guest

Awards and nominations
2008: Benedict Neuenfels won Best Cionematography award for the film in German Film Awards
2008: Christian M. Goldbeck nominated for Best Production Design for the film in German Film Awards
2008: Benedict Neuenfels won Best Cionematography award for the film in the Bavarian Film Awards
2008: Niki Reiser won Best Music award for the film in the Bavarian Film Awards

Soundtrack

A soundtrack album was released containing the following:
Love Life
Attracted to Arie
"If She Had Chosen You..."
"This Is My Life"
Jara
"Don't Forget to Exhale"
Abused
Finding the Truth
The Desert
Bewildered
Caught
The Photo
Jara's Quest
Road to Akko

References

External links

Official website

2000s romance films
2007 films
Films based on Israeli novels
Films shot in Cologne
Films shot in Israel
German romantic drama films
Israeli drama films
2000s German films